Quell and Co is a 1982 film directed by William Witney. It is also known as Showdown at Eagle Gap.

External links
 Quell and Co at Letterbox DVD
 Quell and Co at IMDb

1982 films
Films directed by William Witney
American Western (genre) films
1980s American films